Major Lionel Guy d'Artois  (9 April 1917 – 15 March 1999) was a Canadian Army officer and SOE agent.

Biography
Lionel Guy (generally known by his second name) d'Artois was born in Richmond, Quebec in 1917. He joined the Militia (part-time army reserves) in 1934, at the age of 16. In 1936, he became a student at the Université de Montréal, but dropped his studies in 1939, to enlist as private.

He later joined the First Special Service Force and in 1942 he was commissioned. He served as an instructor in savate, and in August 1943 took part in "Operation Cottage", the reoccupation of the island of Kiska in the Aleutians.

In 1943 he volunteered for SOE, one of several French-Canadians attached to F section. In April 1944 was parachuted into the department of the Saone et Loire, France, and under the codename "Dieudonné" organized, armed and operated with units of the Free French Forces. His service in France during the invasion period were recognised by the award of the Distinguished Service Order (DSO) from Britain and the Croix de Guerre from France.

After the war, he was promoted to major and made commanding officer of the new Canadian Special Air Service Company. In 1947 there was an unusual episode in which he was tasked with the rescue of a severely injured missionary from a remote district in the Far North. The mission took seven weeks altogether (which suggests that Canon J.H. Turner was himself a pretty tough character!), and resulted in d'Artois being decorated with the George Medal (GM) alongside flying officer Robert Race.

He served with the Commonwealth occupation forces in Japan, and then did an operational tour with 1st Bn., Royal 22e Régiment, the "Van Doos", during the Korean War.

War time romance
One of the fellow students on his SOE course in 1943 had been a 19-year-old WAAF officer. Already having two years of service under her belt, she had then volunteered for SOE. She was also training for special operations and, like Guy, was parachuted into France before D-Day, though into a different district and 'Reseau', in the department of the Sarthe. She worked as a courier for Hudson's Reseau 'Headmaster' on the edge of the Normandy Landings. The work was dangerous and she was arrested. However, she managed to maintain her cover and was released, surviving through to liberation by the advancing ground forces. This 20-year-old veteran was herself later decorated. When the couple had both returned to Britain on the successful completion of their separate missions, they were reunited and were quickly married. Assistant Section Officer Sonya Butt, MBE, war heroine, became Mrs. Sonia d'Artois and quietly disappeared from public view to become a wife and mother. Though not unique, by any means, this must have been one of the most distinguished romances of the war.

The couple moved to Quebec and raised a family of six children: three boys (Robert, Michel & Guy) and three girls (Nadya, Christina & Lorraine).

Death
In March 1999, Major L.G. d'Artois, a hero in war and peace, died in the Veterans Hospital in Sainte-Anne-de-Bellevue, Quebec.

References

 
  
 
  
 
 
 https://web.archive.org/web/20081029063628/http://web.mac.com/davedepickere/World_War_II,_analyzed!/Canadian_Secret_Agents_in_the_Second_World_War.html 
 Horne, Bernd, and Michel Wyczynski. In Search of Pegasus. St. Catherines, ON: Vanwell Publishing Ltd, 2001.

Canadian Army personnel of World War II
Canadian military personnel of the Korean War
Special Operations Executive personnel
Canadian military personnel from Quebec
Recipients of the Croix de Guerre 1939–1945 (France)
1917 births
1999 deaths
Recipients of the George Medal
Canadian Companions of the Distinguished Service Order
Royal 22nd Regiment officers